Edward Samuel Briggs (October 4, 1926 – November 22, 2022) was a vice admiral in the United States Navy. Briggs was born in St. Paul, Minnesota, the son of Charles William and Lois lone (née Johnson) Briggs. He served as Commander, Naval Surface Forces Atlantic and retired in 1984. He was succeeded by William F. McCauley. Briggs previously served as a Chief of Staff and plans officer to Admiral James L. Holloway III aboard the USS Oklahoma City. He is an alumnus of the United States Naval Academy (class of 1949). His awards include the Navy Distinguished Service Medal and Legion of Merit.

After his retirement he involved himself with local school districts of his residence in southern California. He resided there with his wife, Nanette Parks, whom he married on June 7, 1949. He had a son, Jeffrey.

In 2021, Briggs signed his name to an open letter dated 14 May 2021, from a group calling themselves Flag Officers 4 America, claiming the 2020 election was stolen from Donald Trump.

Briggs died in Escondido, California on November 22, 2022, at the age of 96.

References

External links

1926 births
2022 deaths
Military personnel from Minnesota
People from Saint Paul, Minnesota
Recipients of the Legion of Merit
Recipients of the Navy Distinguished Service Medal
United States Naval Academy alumni
United States Navy vice admirals